Arn: The Knight Templar is an epic film based on Jan Guillou's trilogy about the fictional Swedish Knight Templar Arn Magnusson. The film was released to cinemas in Sweden on 17 December 2007 and the sequel, Arn – The Kingdom at Road's End (Arn – Riket vid vägens slut), was released 22 August 2008, but both films were combined into a single cut for the English release on DVD in 2010. While the film is mostly in Swedish and most of the production was made in Sweden, the film is a joint production between Sweden, Denmark, Norway, Finland and Germany. With a total budget of around SEK 210 million (ca. US $30 million) for both films, it is the most expensive production in Swedish cinema. The film grossed $22.5 million according to BoxOfficeMojo.

The original movie follows the first two volumes of Guillou's trilogy. An "international" version has been created which incorporates this film and its sequel Arn – The Kingdom at Road's End into a single cut with a duration of approximately 130 minutes.

Plot 

Arn Magnusson  is a son of the powerful Folkung dynasty in the mid-12th century. He grows up in a monastery belonging to the Cistercians and is trained there in archery, swordsmanship and horsemanship by a former Knight Templar, the brother Guilbert. Arn is also discovered to be ambidextrous. One day, while wandering the woods, he encounters three men trying to force a young girl into marriage. When the girl begs Arn for help, two of the men attack him and he kills them in self-defense. Although the monks tell Arn he did nothing wrong, they question Guilbert training him in being a warrior. Guilbert replies that Arn is not meant to be a monk but is destined to be a soldier of God.

When Arn leaves the monastery and returns to his family, he is soon pulled into the struggle between powerful families fighting for the crown of Västra Götaland. He helps his friend Knut Eriksson to kill the old king Karl Sverkersson. This leads to war between the two factions. Arn and his fiancée Cecilia Algotsdotter are excommunicated for premarital relations and falsely accused of having relations with Cecilia's sister (in reality a plot to hurt Knut) and forced to undertake twenty years of penance, Cecilia in a convent and Arn as a Knight Templar in the Holy Land to fight against the Saracens. Cecilia gives birth to Arn's son but the son is taken away from her and she only hears of his survival, and name of Magnus, through another woman who is also named Cecilia, the future queen of Sweden, Cecilia Blanka.

While pursuing a band of thieves, Arn comes across the enemy of all Christendom, Saladin, and saves his life. Saladin thanks Arn by warning him away from Jerusalem because he is leading a vast army towards the city. As Saladin marches upon Jerusalem, Arn is given the order to intercept the Saracens before they reach the city, and he and his men successfully ambush Saladin's army in a mountain pass (the ambush taking the place of the historical Battle of Montgisard figuring in the novel). The movie ends with Arn gaining a letter discharging him from his service in the Holy Land from the Templar Grandmaster Arnold of Torroja and Cecilia giving praise to God on hearing news of Arn's survival.

Cast

 Joakim Nätterqvist as Arn Magnusson
 Sofia Helin as Cecilia Algotsdotter
 Stellan Skarsgård as Birger Brosa, uncle of Arn
 Vincent Pérez as Brother Guilbert
 Simon Callow as Father Henry
 Steven Waddington as Torroja
 Jørgen Langhelle as King Eric IX of Sweden (Erik Jedvardsson)
 Gustaf Skarsgård as King Canute I of Sweden (Knut Eriksson)
 Michael Nyqvist as Magnus Folkesson, Arn's father
 Bibi Andersson as Mother Rikissa
 Milind Soman as Saladin
 Alex Wyndham as Armand de Gascogne
 Nicolas Boulton as Gerard de Ridefort
 Thomas W. Gabrielsson as Emund Ulvbane
 Jakob Cedergren as Ebbe Sunesson
 Julia Dufvenius as Helena Sverkersson
 Lina Englund as Katarina, Cecilia's sister
 Morgan Alling as Eskil Magnusson, Arn's brother
 Fanny Risberg as Cecilia Blanka
 Anders Baasmo Christiansen as the Norwegian templar Harald Øysteinsson
 Driss Roukhe as Fakhir
 Mirja Turestedt as Sigrid
 Joel Kinnaman as Sverker Karlsson

Production

Development
The film production was headed by Svensk Filmindustri in conjunction with Film i Väst, TV4 (Sweden), Danmarks Radio (Denmark), YLE (Finland), TV 2 (Norway) and Telepool (Germany). With a total budget of around US $30,000,000 for the whole production, it is the most expensive production in Scandinavian film history. SVT originally was one of the biggest sponsors of the project, but they pulled out and their role as a major sponsor was taken over by TV4.

Filming 
Most of the Swedish scenes were filmed in the province of Västergötland. Other scenes were filmed in Scotland and Morocco. Most of the actors in the film speak Swedish, while others speak Latin, English, and French. The scenes in the Holy Land use English (although historically it would have been Medieval Latin and Old French) and Arabic, including quotations from the Qur'an.

Soundtrack

The music for the movie was composed by Tuomas Kantelinen. Laleh also recorded the theme song for the film, entitled "Snö,". The track was released as a single in 2007 and was later placed as a track on her 2009 album Me and Simon. "Snö" peaked at #14 on the Swedish Singles Chart.

Track listing
"Snö" by Laleh - 4:30
"Prologe" - 1:07
"Desert Hunt" - 2:49
"The Templar's Theme" - 0:59
"To Varnhems Abbey" - 1:48
"Longing" - 3:34
"Avresan" - 1:04
"Gratias" - 3:26
"Arn & Cecilia" - 3:20
"Adiago" 2:17
"Nightmare" - 1:06
"The Sword" 1:45
"The Abbey" - 2:03
"Axevalla tvekamp" - 2:31
"The Templar's triumf" - 1:28
"Saladin's camp" - 0:37
"The land of home" - 1:48
"The Arrival" - 1:09
"Nuns" - 0:58
"West Götaland" - 2:35
"Reward" - 1:27
"The End" - 2:36
"Snö" by Laleh - 4:30

Reception 
The Guardian credited the film with an exciting plot and convincing acting, and locations that "you don't get bored [of] for a second". However, it criticised the story for not being very believable as the Knights Templar were religious fundamentalists, not "tolerant and multicultural-friendly crusaders".

See also
In hoc signo vinces, sword inscription
Battle of Hattin
Third Crusade
List of historical drama films

References

External links
 Official website

  Arn: The Knight Templar at SF International
 Arn: The Knight Templar preview on european-films.net

2007 films
2000s action drama films
2000s historical romance films
2000s war drama films
Films set in the 12th century
Films based on Swedish novels
Historical action films
2007 3D films
Crusades films
Knights Templar in popular culture
Films directed by Peter Flinth
Films shot in Edinburgh
Films set in Västergötland
Swedish action films
Swedish epic films
Films scored by Tuomas Kantelinen
War epic films
Films set in Jerusalem
2007 drama films
2000s Swedish films